is a passenger railway station in the city of Ōta, Gunma, Japan, operated by the private railway operator Tōbu Railway.

Lines

Station layout
The station consists of two opposed side platforms, connected to the station building by a level crossing.

Platforms

Adjacent stations

History
Kizaki Station opened on 27 March 1910.

From 17 March 2012, station numbering was introduced on all Tōbu lines, with Kizaki Station becoming "TI-20".

Passenger statistics
In fiscal 2019, the station was used by an average of 2470 passengers daily (boarding passengers only).

Surrounding area
Former Ojima town hall
Ojima Post Office

References

External links

 Tobu station information 

Railway stations in Gunma Prefecture
Tobu Isesaki Line
Stations of Tobu Railway
Railway stations in Japan opened in 1910
Ōta, Gunma